Senator Warder may refer to:

Frederick L. Warder (1912–1980), New York State Senate
Walter Warder (1851–1938), Illinois State Senate